Jabal Sawda is a peak located in Saudi Arabia, with a claimed elevation of  , on the basis of which it is claimed to be the second highest point in Saudi Arabia. 

These elevations are both consistent with public domain SRTM data.

In 2020 Al Arabiya (العربية) a official news channel confirmed the mountain to be 3,015 meters (9,891 ft)

The village of Al Souda is located nearby. The town is a tourist centre and has a cable car to the top of the mountain.

Climate

See also

 Geology of Saudi Arabia
 Geography of Saudi Arabia
 List of elevation extremes by country
 Wildlife of Saudi Arabia

References

External links
  

Sawda
Highest points of countries